Lords Institute of Engineering and Technology (LIET) is a self-financing Muslim minority Autonomous engineering college in Hyderabad, Telangana, India, 11 km from Mehdipatnam.It is recognized by Telangana State Council of Higher Education (TSCHE), Government of Telangana; Approved by All India Council for Technical Education (AICTE); Affiliated to Osmania University; Accredited by National Board of Accreditation (NBA), National Assessment and Accreditation Council (NAAC) with 'A' Grade, National Accreditation Board for Testing and Calibration Laboratories (NABL); Conferred as Autonomous by University Grants Commission (UGC) from 2021 to 2032 and empanelled in UGC 2F. LIET hosts the Telangana Chapter of International Network for Outcome Based Education IN4OBE which is first in India.

Academics

Admissions
The college admits total 1140 undergraduates through the statewide TS-EAMCET exam for regular students and TS-ECET exam for diploma and polytechnic students through lateral entry. It offers Bachelor of Engineering (B.E.) degrees in:
 Computer Science and Engineering (CSE) 180 intake
CSE [Artificial Intelligence and Machine Learning] (CSM) 180 intake
CSE [Data Science] (CSD) 180 intake
Artificial Intelligence and Machine Learning 60 intake
Information Technology (IT) 180 intake
Electronics and Communications Engineering (ECE) 120 intake
Civil Engineering (CE) 90 intake
 Mechanical Engineering (ME) 60 intake
 Electrical and Electronics Engineering (EEE) 30 intake

126 students are admitted through GATE and PGECET for the Master of Engineering (M.E.) / Master of Technology (M.Tech.) degrees that are offered in:

 Computer Science and Engineering 36 intake
Structural Engineering 36 intake
 Construction Management 18 intake

The college also admits 120 postgraduate students through ICET for Master of Business Administration (MBA) degree offered by the Department of Management Studies in:

 Finance
 Human Resources
 Marketing

Admissions are also offered to International students and Non-Resident Indians.

Campus 
The college is located in a campus of 10 acres at Himayat Sagar Lake. The 3 lakh sq. ft. built up area houses facilities for academic and non-academic learning for the students. The college is having SWAYAM NPTEL local chapter in association with IIT Madras which issued 155 NPTEL certificates to date; SWAYAM PRABHA in collaboration with IIT Kharagpur for attending online lectures; and remote center of IIT Bombay with RCID-1481 to conduct MOOC, STTPs and FDPs.
The Central Library is spread over an area of about 12,378 sq. ft. with seating capacity of about 400 students in the reading area and 30 computers for access to digital library subscriptions and E-resources such as DELNET, J-GATE, EBSCO, etc. making it one of the big libraries in Hyderabad. There are more than 9,917 titles, 38,472 volumes, 6225 E-Books, 8000 science e-Journals and 17,900 engineering e-Journals, 135 print journals and 1618 CDs collection. There are food courts and a canteen. There is a dispensary with a doctor on call facility for any medical treatment, along with tie ups with nearby hospitals during emergency.

Student life

National Service Scheme (NSS)

Lords Institute of Engineering and Technology is having an active chapter of the National Service Scheme (NSS) under the Ministry of Youth Affairs and Sports under which various social service activities are conducted regularly such as Swachh Bharat Mission, Haritha Haram, Blood Donation Camps, Medical Health Checkup, Traffic Rules Awareness, etc. The college is selected by Unnat Bharat Abhiyan (UBA) Scheme, Ministry of Education to adopt five villages namely Qutubuddinguda, Medipalle (village) and Yelkaguda of Moinabad mandal; Sagar and Darga of Rajendranagar mandal under Ranga Reddy district of Telangana State. where students in consultation with the office of the District Collector have participated in the survey and provided solutions to the identified problems through technology intervention which are funded by UBA.

Sports

Every year, as part of Sanketika, the Inter-College Fest, an inter-department sports competition is held. Competitions are held in various sports such as Football, Cricket, Badminton, Volleyball, Kabadi, Track and Field events. Students have won several awards including BWF Junior World Badminton Championship, Kazan, Russia; International Neymar Jr Five World Football Championship, Brazil; South Zone Inter University Cricket Tournament, Mysore; All India Inter University Taekwondo Tournament, Maharishi Dayanand University, Rohtak; All India Senior National Muay Thai Boxing Championship, Indore; All India Inter University Hockey Tournament, Alagappa University, Karaikudi; Reliance Foundation Youth Sports, Football Tournament by Sporting Club Vijayanagar, Hyderabad; All India Slum Football National Championship, Mumbai; All India Inter University Wrestling Tournament, Chaudhary Bansi Lal University, Bhiwani; South Zone Inter University Football Tournament, Vellore; 6th Telangana State Inter Engineering Collegiate Football Tournament, CMRIT Medchal; 1st ISKU Telangana State Invitational Karate Championship, Hyderabad; etc.

Professional Clubs

Every Department has a Professional Student run Association with office bearers and teams to organize and coordinate for various events. The following is the list of Professional Clubs. The above clubs coordinate and organize student run intra-college technical, cultural and sports events. Details of activities can be found in the respective Department section.

 ACE – Computer Science Engineering
 MEGSO – Mechanical Engineering
 ELECT-ERA – Electrical and Electronics Engineering
 ANIONS – Electronics & Communication Engineering
 TAMEER – Civil Engineering
 SYNERGY – Management

Alumni
Lords Alumni Association is registered as a non-profit organization under the Societies Registration Act., Government of Telangana which is managed by a committee of active Alumni enrolling members from those who graduate from the institution. There is a strong Alumni connect and engagement in the form of annual Alumni Meets, regular guest lectures and seminars delivered by Alumni, internships for students offered by their startups, placement opportunities through employee referral program of their respective workplace, etc.

See also 
Education in India
Literacy in India
List of institutions of higher education in Telangana

References 

All India Council for Technical Education
Engineering colleges in Hyderabad, India
2002 establishments in Andhra Pradesh
Educational institutions established in 2002